McKnightstown is a census-designated place (CDP) in Franklin Township, Adams County, Pennsylvania, United States. It was formerly part of the Cashtown-McKnightstown CDP as of the 2000 census, and was then split into two separate CDPs for the 2010 census. As of the 2020 census the population was 387.

The founder of the Eshelman manufacturing company was born in the town, and the 1919 Motor Transport Corps convoy travelled through the town on the Lincoln Highway before a modern highway bypassed the town in 1948-9.

Demographics

References

Census-designated places in Adams County, Pennsylvania
Census-designated places in Pennsylvania